The 1998 Kansas gubernatorial election took place on November 3, 1998. Incumbent Republican Governor Bill Graves won re-election in a landslide over his opponent, State Representative Tom Sawyer. , this was the last time Douglas County and Wyandotte County voted for the Republican candidate.

Democratic primary

Candidates
Tom Sawyer, Kansas State Representative
Fred Phelps, founder of the Westboro Baptist Church

Results

Republican primary

Candidates
Bill Graves, incumbent Governor of Kansas
David Miller, former Chairman of the Kansas Republican Party

Results

General election

Results

References

1998
Gubernatorial
Kansas